The Union territory of Dadra and Nagar Haveli and Daman and Diu, India consist of three districts.

References

 
D